Richard Robert Elias (January 7, 1955 – April 2, 2019) was an American singer and songwriter based in Nashville.

Elias is best known for being a founding member of Rich Mullins' A Ragamuffin Band, which recorded and toured from 1993 through 2000.

Biography 

Elias was born in San Diego, California, eventually attending Azusa Pacific University outside Los Angeles. In 1984, Elias moved to work full-time in L.A. and within a few years would be recording with producer, Niko Bolas.

Later Elias wrote and produced music in Nashville, Tennessee, while performing solo throughout the U.S. and internationally. His music was included in the 1996 movie That Thing You Do!, Dawsons Creek, My Big Fat Greek Wedding, as well as other albums, independent films, and TV shows. During his career, Elias produced for artists such as Rich Mullins, Amy Grant, Aaron Neville, Michael W. Smith, and Randy Stonehill. He released four solo projects. His work was nominated and awarded by the GMA, UCMVA, and the Nashville Music Awards. His first solo record, Rick Elias & The Confessions, was voted No. 58 in the top 100 greatest albums in Christian music, as listed by CCM Magazine in 2001.

In 2018 it was revealed that he had cancer. A benefit concert was held by members of A Ragamuffin Band and performers from The Jesus Record on February 2, 2019 to raise money for his medical bills. Elias died on April 2, 2019 from brain cancer.

Discography
 Rick Elias & The Confessions (1990, Alarma)
 Ten Stories (1991, Frontline)
 Blink  (1998, Pamplin)
 Confessions of a Ragamuffin (2000, KMG) (compilation album)
 Bootleg (2003) (compilation album)
Bootleg 2: The Legend of Sonny Jim (2009) (compilation album)
 Job (2013)

References

External links

Rick Elias on CD Baby - https://store.cdbaby.com/Artist/RickElias
 

Musicians from Nashville, Tennessee
Musicians from San Diego
Singer-songwriters from Tennessee
Azusa Pacific University alumni
A Ragamuffin Band members
1955 births
2019 deaths
Deaths from brain cancer in the United States
Singer-songwriters from California